The Tatua Co-operative Dairy Company Ltd, trading as Tatua, is an independent co-operative dairy company in the Matamata-Piako District of the Waikato Region, in the North Island of New Zealand.  It is located in the rural locality of Tatuanui, approximately 8 kilometres east of Morrinsville. The co-operative is owned by 106 shareholder farms, all located within a 12 kilometre radius of the processing factory.

Independence
The co-operative has maintained a strong independent history within the New Zealand dairy industry.  In the 2001 mega-merger for the New Zealand dairy industry - which formed Fonterra - Tatua shareholders decided to remain independent. Given that New Zealand had over 500 dairy co-operatives in the 1930s, Tatua is unique in that it is the only New Zealand dairy co-operative remaining that has never been part of any merger throughout its history.

Performance
Tatua often records the highest payout for milksolids to the farmer shareholders in New Zealand. While the high level of payout is partly due to a small catchment area (which reduces processing costs), the excellent financial performance of Tatua is increasingly attributed to focusing on value-added milk products rather than traditional, mass-produced, commodity-based milk products such as milk powder, butter and cheese.

See also
Dairy farming in New Zealand

Organisational Memberships
 New Zealand Co-operatives Association (Inc)
 Dairy Companies Association of New Zealand (DCANZ)

References

External links
 

Dairy cooperatives
Dairy products companies of New Zealand
Cooperatives in New Zealand